Ernst Maass (12 April 1856, in Kolberg – 11 November 1929, in Marburg) was a German classical philologist.

From 1875 he studied at the universities of Tübingen and Greifswald, receiving his doctorate in 1879 as a student of Ulrich von Wilamowitz-Moellendorff. After graduation, he took an extended study trip to Italy, Paris and London (1880–82), and afterwards qualified as a lecturer in Berlin with the habilitation-thesis Analecta Eratosthenica. In 1886, he was named a professor at the University of Greifswald, and from 1895 to 1924, served as a professor and director of the philological seminary at the University of Marburg. In 1910/11 he was rector at the university.

Selected works 
 Arati Phaenomena (edition of Aratus' Phaenomena).
 Commentatio mythographica, 1886.
 De Attali Rhodii fragmentis Arateis commentatio, 1888.
 Scholia Graeca in Homeri Iliadem Townleyana (with Wilhelm Dindorf, 1888).
 Parerga Attica, 1889.
 De Aeschyli Supplicibus commentatio, 1890.
 De tribus Philetae carminibus, 1895.
 Orpheus; Untersuchungen zur griechischen, römischen, altchristlichen Jenseitsdichtung und Religion, 1895 – Orpheus: Investigations of Greek, Roman and early Christian afterlife literature and religion. 
 De Lenaeo et Delphinio commentatio, 1896.
 Commentariorum in Aratum reliquiae, 1898.
 Analecta sacra et profana, 1901.
 Die Tagesgötter in Rom und den Provinzen, aus der Kultur des Niederganges der antiken Welt, 1902 – The Tagesgötter in Rome and the provinces. 
 Griechen und Semiten auf dem Isthmus von Korinth, 1903 – Greeks and Semites on the Isthmus of Corinth.
 Goethe und die antike, 1912 – Goethe and antiquity.

References 

1856 births
1929 deaths
People from Kołobrzeg
University of Tübingen alumni
University of Greifswald alumni
Academic staff of the University of Greifswald
Academic staff of the University of Marburg
German classical philologists